Double linking is an organizing principle developed by Gerard Endenburg, a Dutch engineer, as part of the so-called sociocratic circular method. It operates as an extension of Rensis Likert's (single) linking pin. In the sociocratic approach, decision-making is structured in circles. Each circle is connected to the next higher circle by way of the functional leader (appointed in the next higher circle) and a representative chosen in the circle. Both the functional leader and the representative participate in policy decisions taken in the lower as well as higher circle.

See also
 Sociocracy

References

Management by type